Bernice Tlalane Mohapeloa BEM (1899–1997) was an educator and activist from Lesotho.

Early life 
Born Nee Morolong in Mafeteng, she received her primary education there, passing her standard six examinations in 1913. The next year she began teacher training at Thabana Morena Girls' School, completing the course in 1915, in which year she went to South Africa to attend Lovedale High School. Receiving her junior certificate in 1918, she went to Fort Hare University College in 1919, obtaining her teacher's diploma in 1922. In 1930 she married Joel Thabiso Mohapeloa.

Career 
In 1943 she began teaching at Basutoland High School. In 1944 Mohapeloa founded the Basutoland Homemakers' Association, modeled on similar clubs, such as the Home Improvement Club at Fort Hare University College, which she had encountered in South Africa.

Honors and recognitions 
For this, she received the British Empire Medal in the 1946 Birthday Honours, in the same year becoming the first African woman to receive the Dorothy Cadbury Fellowship. Mohapeloa was one of the most influential women in Lesotho's modern history; among those who counted her as a role model was politician 'Matlelima Hlalele.

References

1899 births
1997 deaths
Lesotho educators
Women educators
Lesotho women activists
People from Mafeteng District
University of Fort Hare alumni
Recipients of the British Empire Medal